Petrova Lehota  is a village and municipality in Trenčín District in the Trenčín Region of north-western Slovakia.

History
In historical records the village was first mentioned in 1346.

Geography
The municipality lies at an altitude of 387 metres and covers an arae of 8.069 km². It has a population of about 165 people.

External links
http://www.statistics.sk/mosmis/eng/run.html

Villages and municipalities in Trenčín District